List of archipelagos by number of islands, islets, reefs, coral reefs and cays:

See also 

 List of archipelagos
 List of countries by number of islands
 Archipelagic state

References 

 
Archipelagoes